A Fine Pair (original title Ruba al prossimo tuo) is a 1968 Italian crime-comedy film directed by Francesco Maselli. It stars Rock Hudson and Claudia Cardinale, who had co-starred together two years earlier in the romantic drama, Blindfold.

Plot    
A New York policeman (Hudson) unintentionally helps a thief (Cardinale) who has planned to steal the jewels of an Austrian villa.

Cast
 Rock Hudson as Captain Mike Harmon
 Claudia Cardinale as Esmeralda Marini
 Tomas Milian as Roger
 Leon Askin as Chief Wellman
 Ellen Corby as Maddy Walker
 Walter Giller as Franz
 Guido Alberti as Uncle Camillo Marini
 Peter Dane as Albert Kinsky
 Tony Lo Bianco as Officer McClusky

References

External links
 
 
 

1968 films
1968 comedy films
1960s crime comedy films
1960s heist films
Cinema Center Films films
Films directed by Francesco Maselli
Films scored by Ennio Morricone
Films set in Austria
Films set in New York City
Films set in Rome
Films shot in Austria
Films shot in New York City
Films shot in Rome
Italian crime comedy films
Italian heist films
1960s Italian-language films
1960s Italian films